Bagicz  (formerly German Bodenhagen) is a settlement in the administrative district of Gmina Ustronie Morskie, within Kołobrzeg County, West Pomeranian Voivodeship, in north-western Poland.

For the history of the region, see History of Pomerania.

The settlement has a population of 38.

References

Bagicz